Reynor is a surname. Notable people with the surname include:

 Jack Reynor (born 1992), Irish actor
 John Reynor (born 1964), Irish soccer player